Avondale United F.C. is an Irish association football club based in Carrigaline, County Cork. Their senior team play in the Munster Senior League Senior Premier Division. They also regularly compete in the FAI Cup, the FAI Intermediate Cup and the Munster Senior Cup. Avondale has won the FAI Intermediate Cup a record eight times and have been Munster Senior League champions on eight occasions. After winning the 2012–13 Munster title, they were also invited to play in the 2014 League of Ireland Cup. The club also fields reserve, intermediate, junior, youth and schoolboy teams in the Munster Senior League, the Cork Schoolboys League and the Cork City & County Youths League.

History
Avondale United was formed in Ballintemple, Cork in 1972 with one junior team. They originally played in the Cork Athletic Union League and remained members of this league until 1989. Youth and schoolboys sides were added in 1973–74 and 1974–75 respectively and in 1977–78 Avondale joined the Munster Senior League. In addition to winning an assortment of intermediate, junior, youth and schoolboy honours, Avondale has also enjoyed success at senior level, both nationally and provincially. They were quarter-finalists in the 1994–95 and 2014 FAI Cups. They have also been Munster Senior Cup finalists on three occasions. In recent years Avondale United have virtually monopolised the FAI Intermediate Cup. In 2013–14 they won the cup for the fourth successive occasion, equalling a seventy two-year-old record held by Distillery. Since 2005–06 they have reached the final on seven occasions, including five consecutive appearances as well as four wins in a row.

Home grounds
The club originally played their home games on privately rented or public pitches. However, in 1986 the club purchased the grounds now known as Avondale Park in Carrigaline. The adult and youth teams are based at Avondale Park. A short time before this the use of Beaumont Park in Blackrock, Cork was made available to the club by the Blackrock Community Association. The club now holds a ninety nine-year lease on this venue. This ground is now the club's schoolboy headquarters. In recent years the club has also used another private ground at Bessboro Cross, Blackrock.

Notable former players
Republic of Ireland international
  Damien Delaney
Republic of Ireland U21 international
  Eoghan O'Connell
Others
  Tom Cashman – Cork GAA hurler and manager 
  Simon Zebo – Ireland rugby union international
  Alan Kelly (referee)

Notable former managers
  John Caulfield

Honours
FAI Intermediate Cup
Winners: 1977–78, 2005–06, 2006–07, 2010–11, 2011–12, 2012–13, 2013–14 ,2018–19:8Runners-up: 2009–10: 1 Munster Senior League Senior Premier DivisionWinners:  1987–88, 1992–93, 1995–96, 2003–04, 2008–09, 2009–10, 2011–12, 2012–13, 2013-14: 9 
Runners-up: 1985–86, 1988–89, 1991–92, 1993–94, 1994–95, 2005–06, 2007–08: 7Munster Senior League Senior First DivisionWinners: 2002–03: 1 Munster Senior CupRunners-up: 2004–05, 2012–13, 2014–15: 3'

References

Association football clubs in Cork (city)
Munster Senior League (association football) clubs
Association football clubs in County Cork
Association football clubs established in 1972
1972 establishments in Ireland
Former Cork Athletic Union League clubs